(), also called , , fan of reunion, are typically silk rigid hand fan which originated in China; they are typically circular or oval in shape. Up to the Song dynasty, the  appears to have the most common types of the fans in China. These types of fans were mostly used by women in the Tang dynasty.  with Chinese paintings and with calligraphy became very popular by the Song dynasty among court circles and artists and even continued to be in use even by the end of the 19th century. The  was also used as part of the traditional Chinese wedding and was part of the ceremonial wedding rite.

The  was also introduced in other countries, such as Japan. The  also remained mainstream in China even after the growing popularity of the folding fans which originated in Japan.

Origins 
The  originated in China, its prototype was round silk fan which was developed in the Eastern Han dynasty which was itself developed based on the earlier Chinese fans design.

Cultural significance 
Fans play a significant aspect in Chinese culture and Chinese life regarding of social identities and ranks, having functional usage such as cooling and facilitates air circulation and was used as a sartorial accessory and held an important ceremonial use. Over time, the Chinese fans have evolved in a cultural artifacts which reflects and incorporate the essence of Chinese folklore culture.

Wedding 
Chinese brides also used a type of moon-shaped  in traditional Chinese wedding called . This ceremonial rite is referred as Etiquette of removing fan; the performance of such rite can be traced back to the Tang dynasty and continued in the Song dynasty.

Design and construction 

Traditionally, they were made of bamboo or ivory with silk fabric, which would stretch across the rigid frame. It could be decorated with Chinese embroideries or Chinese paintings.

See also 
 Hanfu accessories
 Traditional Chinese wedding dress
 Hand fan

Gallery

Notes

References 

Chinese culture
Chinese inventions
Fashion accessories
Hand tools
Chinese traditional clothing